John Henry Mortimore (23 September 1934 – 26 January 2021) was an English football player and manager.

Career
Mortimore played as a centre half in the Football League for Chelsea, with whom he scored 10 goals from 279 games in all competitions between 1956 and 1965 and won the 1965 Football League Cup, and for Queens Park Rangers. As manager, he had spells at Portsmouth, Benfica, where he won the national championship in both 1976–77 and 1986–87, and the Portuguese Cup in 1986 and 1987, Belenenses and, in a very brief stint as joint caretaker, Southampton. He also coached at clubs including Sunderland, Chelsea and Southampton, where he eventually became club president.

He died on 26 January 2021, aged 86.

Honours

Player
Chelsea
Football League Cup: 1964–65

Manager
Benfica	
Primeira Liga: 1976–77, 1986–87
Taça de Portugal: 1985–86, 1986–87
Supertaça Cândido de Oliveira: 1985

References

1934 births
2021 deaths
People from Farnborough, Hampshire
English footballers
Association football defenders
Woking F.C. players
Chelsea F.C. players
Queens Park Rangers F.C. players
English Football League players
English football managers
English expatriate football managers
Ethnikos Piraeus F.C. managers
Portsmouth F.C. managers
S.L. Benfica managers
Real Betis managers
C.F. Os Belenenses managers
Southampton F.C. managers
Chelsea F.C. non-playing staff
Southampton F.C. directors and chairmen
Expatriate football managers in Portugal
Expatriate football managers in Spain
English expatriate sportspeople in Portugal
English expatriate sportspeople in Spain